The United States-Japan Joint Nuclear Energy Action Plan is a bilateral agreement aimed at putting in place a framework for the joint research and development of  nuclear energy technology. The agreement was signed on April 18, 2007. Japan also has agreements with Australia, Canada, China, France, and the United Kingdom and is discussing agreements with other nations.

Under the plan, the United States and Japan will each conduct research into fast reactor technology, fuel cycle technology, advanced computer simulation and modeling, small and medium reactors, safeguards and physical protection, and nuclear waste management. The work is to be coordinated by a joint steering committee.

An initial report on progress was due in April 2008.

See also

United States Global Nuclear Energy Partnership
Nuclear Power 2010 Program
Nuclear power in the United States
Energy policy of the United States
Energy in Japan
Nuclear power in Japan

References

Nuclear energy in the United States
Nuclear energy in Japan
Action plans
Japan–United States relations